Manfred Ramminger (15 December 1930 - November 1997) was a German architect, playboy, and KGB agent. He is noted for his theft of an American AIM-9 Sidewinder Air-to-Air Infrared Homing Missile which he then brought to the Soviet Union.

Background

Manfred Ramminger was born in Groß-Scharellen in East Prussia on December 15, 1930 to a bricklayer and his wife. His family fled the area in 1945 after the Soviet invasion of East Prussia, and settled in the town of Krefeld. After graduating high school, Ramminger studied engineering with minor success, being involved in a small construction company in the 1950s before his partner left the business. 

Ramminger also had a reputation for being a playboy. He was known for driving a blue Maserati race car, winning a dozen trophies in various races, and having a possible affair with a married woman.

Theft of the Sidewinder

In 1951, Polish locksmith and concentration camp survivor Josef Linowski (or Linowsky) was living in West Germany, and while visiting family in Poland was recruited by the Polish Ministry of Public Security. He in turn recruited Ramminger and Wolf-Diethardt Knoppe, the latter of whom was a West German military pilot since 1956.

Linowski was given a number of tasks by his superiors: at first stealing a Litton LM-II navigation box from the Neuburg Air Base, and later to steal a Phantom aircraft. Realizing the difficulty of such a task, Linowski decided instead to steal the Sidewinder missile. 

On 22 October, 1967 the trio entered the Neuburg base with Knoppe's base security pass, taking advantage of the thick fog that evening. They identified the missile in an ammunition depot and put it in a wheelbarrow, driving down the entire runway before placing it in Ramminger's Mercedes Sedan outside the base. It being too big to lay flat, Ramminger broke the rear window to poke it through. To not catch the police's attention, he covered the missile up with a carpet and noting the protrusion with a piece of red cloth, which was required by law. 

Returning to Krefeld (some 200 miles away) Ramminger dismantled and packed the missile for Moscow through airmail, with the shipping costs coming out to $79.25 due to the extra weight. They were to be flown to Moscow from Düsseldorf via Copenhagen, with Ramminger boarding the same plane. However, due to an error, the crates were returned to Düsseldorf. Ramminger had to fly back to Germany, and redeem the packages before boarding the next flight to the Soviet Union. 

Ramminger and his aides were arrested by West German authorities in 1968. Ramminger and Linowski were sentenced to four years in prison, with Knoppe sentenced to three years and three months on 7 October, 1970. However, in a prisoner swap for Western spies, Ramminger was released in August 1971.

References

  

1930 births
1997 deaths
German spies
German people convicted of spying for the Soviet Union
People convicted of spying for the Polish People's Republic
German racing drivers
20th-century German architects
20th-century Prussian people